Piotr Chrapkowski (born 24 March 1988) is a Polish handball player for SC Magdeburg and the Polish national team.

He is a bronze medalist of the 2015 World Championship.

Personal life
Chrapkowski was born in Kartuzy, but grew up in Goręczyno. In December 2012 he married Dagmara Stawrosiejko. On 2 June 2015, their first daughter Sara was born. On 2 December 2016, his wife gave birth to their second daughter.

Career
He debuted on the national team on 5 June 2010, in friendly match against Lithuania (31:31).

In May 2013 moved to Vive Targi Kielce. With team from Kielce, he achieved eight titles of the Polish Superliga.

On 1 February 2015, Poland, including Chrapkowski, won bronze medal of the 2015 World Championship. They won the bronze medal match (29:28) against Spain. He dedicated his bronze medal to his wife and unborn daughter.

Achievements
Wisła Płock
Polish Superliga: 2010–11

PGE Vive Kielce
Polish Superliga: 2013–14, 2014–15, 2015–16, 2016–17
Cup of Poland: 2003, 2013, 2014, 2015, 2016, 2017, 2018
EHF Champions League: 2015–16

State awards
 2015  Silver Cross of Merit

References

External links

Polish Handball Association player profile
Vive Targi Kielce player profile

1988 births
Living people
People from Kartuzy
Sportspeople from Pomeranian Voivodeship
Polish male handball players
Wisła Płock (handball) players
Vive Kielce players
Handball-Bundesliga players
Expatriate handball players
Polish expatriate sportspeople in Germany
SC Magdeburg players